The 2020 United States presidential election in Rhode Island was held on Tuesday, November 3, 2020, as part of the 2020 United States presidential election in which all 50 states plus the District of Columbia participated. Rhode Island voters chose electors to represent them in the Electoral College via a popular vote, pitting the Republican Party's nominee, incumbent President Donald Trump, and running mate Vice President Mike Pence against Democratic Party nominee, former Vice President Joe Biden, and his running mate California Senator Kamala Harris. Rhode Island has four electoral votes in the Electoral College.

Rhode Island became one of three states where Biden won every county during the election, the other two being Massachusetts and Hawaii.

Rhode Island weighed in for this election as 17% more Democratic than the national average.

Primary elections
The primary elections were originally scheduled for April 28, 2020. On March 23, they were moved to June 2 due to concerns over the COVID-19 pandemic.

Republican primary
Donald Trump won the Republican primary, and received all of the state's 19 delegates to the 2020 Republican National Convention.

Democratic primary

General election

Predictions

Polling

Graphical summary

Aggregate polls

Polls

Results

Results by county

Counties that flipped from Republican to Democratic 
Kent (largest municipality: Warwick)

Results by municipality

Municipalities that flipped from Republican to Democratic
Lincoln (Providence County)
Richmond (Washington County)
West Warwick (Kent County)

By congressional district
Biden won both congressional districts.

Analysis 
Biden flipped the reliably Democratic Kent County back into the Democratic column, after Trump narrowly flipped it in 2016. Of the fourteen towns that voted for Trump in 2016, Biden flipped back three: Lincoln, Richmond, and West Warwick. Overall, Biden won Rhode Island by 20.8 points, improving on Clinton's 15.5 point win. Rhode Island is the only state in which neither Biden nor Trump broke the all-time Democrat or all-time Republican record for most votes earned in a general election (Lyndon B. Johnson and Dwight D. Eisenhower).

Biden's best towns were Rhode Island's wealthiest (such as Barrington, Jamestown, and East Greenwich) and poorest (such as heavily Latino Central Falls). Trump performed best with middle-income voters. This strength allowed Trump to hold formerly Democratic towns like Johnston, which is largely Catholic and middle-class. According to a post-election voter survey conducted by the Associated Press, Trump carried Catholic voters, 50% to 49%.

Biden became the first Democrat since 1912 to win without the towns of Burrillville and North Smithfield, the first since 1916 to win without Johnston and Smithfield, and the first since 1936 to win without Coventry.

Notes

See also
 2020 Rhode Island elections
 United States presidential elections in Rhode Island
 2020 United States presidential election
 2020 Democratic Party presidential primaries
 2020 Republican Party presidential primaries
 2020 United States elections

References

External links
 
 
  (state affiliate of the U.S. League of Women Voters)
 

Rhode Island
2020
Presidential